Super Invader (also called Super Invasion and Apple Invader) is a video game written by Japanese programmer M. Hata for the Apple II and published by Creative Computing Software in 1979. Super Invader is a clone of Space Invaders.

Release
The game was released in November 1979, and by June 1982 had sold 20,000 copies to tie with Ultima and Castle Wolfenstein for seventh on Computer Gaming Worlds list of top sellers. It received the award for "Most Popular Program of 1978–1980 for the Apple Computer" in a Softalk readers poll. The magazine later described the game as the "progenitor of home arcades."

Super Invader was also released as  Cosmos Mission in September 1980 by California Pacific, debuting at 24 on Softalk's list of bestselling Apple II software.

References

Apple II games
Apple II-only games
1979 video games
California Pacific Computer Company games
Video game clones
Fixed shooters
Space Invaders
Video games developed in Japan
Single-player video games